Avdotyino is a rural locality (a village) in Razdolyevskoye Rural Settlement of Kolchuginsky District, Vladimir Oblast, Russia. The population was 3 as of 2010. There are 2 streets.

Geography 
Avdotyino is located 8 km southwest of Kolchugino (the district's administrative centre) by road. Korobovshchinsky is the nearest rural locality.

References 

Rural localities in Kolchuginsky District